Material World was a weekly science magazine programme on BBC Radio 4 broadcast on a Thursday afternoon. The programme's regular presenter was Quentin Cooper, with contributions from scientists researching areas under discussion in each programme.

History
The programme began as The Material World in April 1998.  It was presented by Trevor Phillips, a chemistry graduate of Imperial College. In September 2000 Phillips was told that he could no longer work at the BBC due to his close links with the Labour Party, which broke BBC rules of impartiality. He was one of the few regular black broadcasters on Radio 4. The programme was presented by Quentin Cooper from 2000 to its end in 2013.

Material World was one of the BBC's main conduits for up-to-date scientific news, along with Frontiers, Science in Action, and Bang Goes the Theory.

From 5 April 2010 the programme was repeated on a Monday evening at 21.00, in the former slot of Costing the Earth. For a short time, when programmes on 5 Live began webstreaming with video, Material World was also webcast.

On 14 June 2013 it was announced that the show was to be cancelled, to be replaced by a new show, Inside Science. The last programme presented by Quentin Cooper was broadcast on 20 June 2013 with the final episode airing a week later on 27 June 2013, presented by Gareth Mitchell.

Structure
A typical episode programme covered three or four topics, giving each 7–10 minutes. For many years the programme was divided into two sections of fifteen minutes on separate topics. It took the form of interviewing a guest scientist or engineer.  Cooper often ended the programme with a terrible scientific pun.

Many past programmes are available for online listening via the programme's website. Some sequential sets of programmes were made in collaboration with the Open University.

See also
 Association of British Science Writers

References

External links
 BBC Radio 4's Material World official site
 BBC Radio 4's Material World Archive page
 Co-operation with the Open University
 Assistance with the Open University
 So You Want To Be A Scientist?

BBC Radio 4 programmes
Educational broadcasting in the United Kingdom
Science podcasts
Science in society
1998 radio programme debuts
Science and technology in the United Kingdom
Open University
Science radio programmes